Marina Sánchez (born 9 January 1977) is a Spanish sailor. She competed in the Yngling event at the 2004 Summer Olympics.

References

External links
 

1977 births
Living people
Spanish female sailors (sport)
Olympic sailors of Spain
Sailors at the 2004 Summer Olympics – Yngling
Snipe class female world champions
Place of birth missing (living people)